Landgericht may refer to:

 Landgericht (Germany), a mid-level court in the present-day judicial system of Germany
 For example,
 Landgericht Berlin
 Landgericht Bremen
 Landgericht (medieval), a regional magistracy in the Holy Roman Empire